Qaleh Gardan (also Romanized as Qal‘eh Gardan; also known as Baladeh) is a village in Baladeh Rural District, Khorramabad District, Tonekabon County, Mazandaran Province, Iran. At the 2006 census, its population was 1,387, in 378 families.

References 

Populated places in Tonekabon County